Brennan Price Johnson (born 23 May 2001) is a professional footballer who plays as a forward for  club Nottingham Forest and the Wales national team.

Early life
Johnson was born in Nottingham, Nottinghamshire. He is the son of former footballer David Johnson.

Club career
After joining the Nottingham Forest academy from Dunkirk at eight years old, Johnson made his first-team debut aged 18, appearing on 3 August 2019 as an 88th-minute substitute in a 2–1 loss against West Bromwich Albion on the opening day of the season.

On 25 September 2020, Johnson joined League One club Lincoln City on a season-long loan. He made his debut two days later, coming off the bench against Charlton Athletic. He scored his first career goal against Plymouth Argyle, heading in from close range. In April 2021, Johnson scored his first career hat-trick in a match against Milton Keynes Dons, taking Johnson just 11 minutes to accomplish this feat.

Johnson's first professional goal for Nottingham Forest came in a 1–1 draw against local rivals Derby County on 28 August 2021. Forest experienced an upturn of form after the appointment of Steve Cooper, replacing Chris Hughton, and after scoring one goal and providing two assists in a month where Forest had three wins, Johnson was awarded the EFL Young Player of the Month award for September 2021. Johnson was awarded the EFL Championship Player of the Month award for April 2022 after his four goals and four assists fired Forest into the play-offs, narrowly missing out on automatic promotion. Johnson ended the season as Forest's top scorer with 19 goals in all competitions, including in both semi-final legs of their successful play-off campaign. He was named the EFL Championship Young Player of the Season.

On 1 July 2022, Johnson signed a new four-year contract with Nottingham Forest, keeping him at the club until 2026.

International career
Johnson was eligible to represent England, Jamaica and Wales at international level. He played for England under-17s before switching to Wales in 2018. In September 2020 Johnson was called up to the senior Wales squad for the first time.

Johnson made his Wales debut in a 0–0 draw against the USA on 12 November 2020. He made his first start for Wales against Finland on 1 September 2021, in which he won a penalty. Johnson scored his first goal for Wales on 11 June 2022 in a 1–1 UEFA Nations League draw against Belgium. In November 2022 he was named in the Wales squad for the 2022 FIFA World Cup in Qatar.

Career statistics

Club

International

Scores and results list Wales' goal tally first, score column indicates score after each Johnson goal

Honours
Nottingham Forest
EFL Championship play-offs: 2022

Individual
EFL Young Player of the Month: September 2021
EFL Championship Young Player of the Season: 2021–22
EFL Championship Player of the Month: April 2022

References

External links

Profile at the Nottingham Forest F.C. website

2001 births
Living people
Footballers from Nottingham
English footballers
Welsh footballers
Association football forwards
Nottingham Forest F.C. players
Lincoln City F.C. players
English Football League players
Premier League players
England youth international footballers
Wales youth international footballers
Wales under-21 international footballers
Wales international footballers
2022 FIFA World Cup players
British sportspeople of Jamaican descent
English sportspeople of Jamaican descent
English people of Welsh descent
Welsh people of Jamaican descent